Superior Township is one of the twelve townships of Williams County, Ohio, United States.  The 2000 census found 5,769 people in the township, 1,452 of whom lived in the unincorporated portions of the township.

Geography
Located in the central part of the county, it borders the following townships:
Bridgewater Township - north
Madison Township - northeast
Jefferson Township - east
Pulaski Township - southeast corner
Center Township - south
St. Joseph Township - southwest corner
Florence Township - west
Northwest Township - northwest corner

It is one of only two county townships (the other being Jefferson Township) without a border on another county.

Most of the village of Montpelier is located in northeastern Superior Township.

Name and history
Superior Township was organized in 1839. It is the only Superior Township statewide.

Government
The township is governed by a three-member board of trustees, who are elected in November of odd-numbered years to a four-year term beginning on the following January 1. Two are elected in the year after the presidential election and one is elected in the year before it. There is also an elected township fiscal officer, who serves a four-year term beginning on April 1 of the year after the election, which is held in November of the year before the presidential election. Vacancies in the fiscal officership or on the board of trustees are filled by the remaining trustees.

References

External links
County website

Townships in Williams County, Ohio
Townships in Ohio